Woodyard may refer to:

Surnames 
Alex Woodyard (born 1993), English footballer
Harry C. Woodyard, an American politician
Harry Woodyard (Illinois politician), an American politician
John Robert Woodyard, a U.S. physicist
Mark Woodyard, baseball player
Sam Woodyard, an American jazz drummer
Terrence Woodyard, basketball player
Wesley Woodyard, an American football player

Places 
Woodyard, Illinois, United States
Woodyard, Maryland, United States
Woodyard, West Virginia, United States
Woodyardville, Arkansas, United States
Devil's Woodyard, mud volcano, Trinidad

See also
Woodward (disambiguation)
Woodard (disambiguation)